

Player awards (NBA)

Regular Season MVP 
 Moses Malone, Philadelphia 76ers

NBA Finals MVP 

 Moses Malone, Philadelphia 76ers

Collegiate awards
 Men
John R. Wooden Award: Ralph Sampson, Virginia
Frances Pomeroy Naismith Award: Ray McCallum, Ball State
Associated Press College Basketball Player of the Year: Ralph Sampson, Virginia
NCAA basketball tournament Most Outstanding Player: Patrick Ewing, Georgetown
Associated Press College Basketball Coach of the Year: Guy Lewis, Houston
Naismith Outstanding Contribution to Basketball: John Wooden
 Women
Naismith College Player of the Year: Anne Donovan, Old Dominion
Wade Trophy: LaTaunya Pollard, Long Beach
NCAA basketball tournament Most Outstanding Player: Cheryl Miller, USC

Naismith Memorial Basketball Hall of Fame
Class of 1983:
Bill Bradley
Dave DeBusschere
Jack Twyman
Dean Smith

Births

January 29 — Nedžad Sinanović, Bosnian basketball player

Deaths

May 20 — Clair Bee, American Hall of Fame college coach (Long Island) (born 1896)
June 6 — Curly Armstrong, American NBA player (Fort Wayne Pistons) (born 1918)
June 19 — Dave Quabius, American NBL player (Sheboygan Red Skins, Oshkosh All-Stars) (born 1916)
July 12 — Donald White, All-American player (Purdue) and college coach (Washington University, Connecticut, Rutgers) (born 1898)
July 15 — Gary Bradds, American NBA/ABA player, college All-American at Ohio State (born 1942)
December 4 — Bruce Drake, American Hall of Fame college coach (Oklahoma Sooners) (born 1905)
December 21 — Mark Workman, All-American college player (West Virginia) and NBA player (born 1930)

See also
 1983 in sports

References